Canova is a crater on Mercury.  Its name was adopted by the International Astronomical Union (IAU) in 2018, after Italian sculptor Antonio Canova.

Hollows are present within the crater and to the northwest of it.

References

Antonio Canova
Impact craters on Mercury